Daphnella terina is a species of sea snail, a marine gastropod mollusk in the family Raphitomidae.

Description
The length of the shell attains 5 mm, its diameter 2.5 mm.

The delicate, white shell has a fusiform shape. It contains six whorls. The upper ones are turreted and finely striated. The subsequent whorls show indistinct longitudinal ribs, except on the body whorl. The body whorl shows brown spots below the suture and brown flames at the back and below. The narrow aperture is oblique. The outer lip is simple. The sinus is small.

Distribution
This marine species occurs off the Fiji Islands, Loyalty Islands, New Caledonia and the Gulf of Carpentaria to Queensland, Australia

References

 Cernohorsky, W.O. 1978. Tropical Pacific marine shells. Sydney : Pacific Publications 352 pp., 68 pls.

External links
 
 Gastropods.com: Daphnella (Daphnella) terina
  Hedley, C. 1922. A revision of the Australian Turridae. Records of the Australian Museum 13(6): 213-359, pls 42-56 

terina
Gastropods described in 1896